Campydelta campyla is a moth in the family Noctuidae first described by George Hampson in 1909. It is found in much of central Africa.

References

Hadeninae
Moths of Africa
Moths described in 1909